Dato' Sri Ang Tjoen Ming (born 26 March 1952), commonly known as Tahir, is an Indonesian billionaire, and a banking and property magnate. He is the founder of the Mayapada Group. On 13 December 2019, President Joko Widodo appointed Tahir to the Presidential Advisory Council.

Early life and education 
Tahir was born in Surabaya, East Java, in 1952, in a slum area. He was raised by his parents who made a living by constructing pedicabs, known as becak. In 1971, he graduated from Petra Kalianyar Christian High School in Surabaya. Tahir wanted to be a medical doctor, but when his father fell sick and could not afford his medical school tuition, Tahir dropped out of college to focus on helping with his father's business.

He received a scholarship from Nanyang Technological Institute (now Nanyang Technological University) in Singapore, earning a Bachelor of Arts/Science. At the age of 35, he went to Golden Gate University in California and completed his Master's degree in financial education.

Business career 
During his studies in Singapore, Tahir started small trade business, buying merchandise from Singapore and selling it in Surabaya when he went home for vacation. This business was his introduction to import trading. In 1986, he established The Mayapada Group and expanded the business to many sectors including garments, finance, automobiles, health and media. During the 1997-98 Asian monetary crisis, Mayapada Bank survived even though many other banking corporations collapsed, because bank was not taking credit from international sources.

Philanthropy 
In 2013, Tahir contributed more than US$100 million to the Bill & Melinda Gates Foundation, an organization that provides funding for efforts to fight major diseases such as HIV/AIDS, Tuberculosis, polio and malaria.

References

External links 
 Tahir Foundation

Living people
1952 births
Giving Pledgers
21st-century philanthropists
Indonesian businesspeople
Indonesian billionaires
Indonesian Christians
Indonesian philanthropists
Indonesian people of Chinese descent
Mayapada
People from Surabaya